The following low-power television stations broadcast on digital or analog channel 18 in the United States:

 K18AD-D in East Wenatchee, etc., Washington
 K18BN-D in Glasgow, Montana
 K18CB-D in Bullhead City, Arizona
 K18CR-D in Circle, etc., Montana
 K18DD-D in Camp Verde, Arizona
 K18DG-D in Alexandria, Minnesota
 K18DL-D in Logan, Utah
 K18DP-D in Lovelock, Nevada
 K18DR-D in Cortez, etc., Colorado
 K18DT-D in Coeur D'Alene, Idaho
 K18EL-D in Newberg/Tigard, Oregon
 K18ET-D in Orderville, Utah
 K18FN-D in Peetz, Colorado
 K18FO-D in Idalia, Colorado
 K18FR-D in Newport, Oregon
 K18FU-D in Rural Beaver County, Utah
 K18GD-D in Redstone, Colorado
 K18GF-D in Little Falls, Minnesota
 K18GG-D in Mina/Luning, Nevada
 K18GM-D in Pleasant Valley, Colorado
 K18GT-D in Ryndon, Nevada
 K18GU-D in Ottumwa, Iowa
 K18GX-D in Juab, Utah
 K18HD-D in Bakersfield, California
 K18HF-D in Gallup, New Mexico
 K18HH-D in The Dalles, Oregon
 K18HQ-D in Sandpoint, Idaho
 K18HR-D in Conchas Dam, New Mexico
 K18HX-D in Hollis, Oklahoma
 K18HZ-D in Navajo Mountain, Utah
 K18IA-D in Oljeto, Utah
 K18IB-D in Mexican Hat, Utah
 K18IM-D in Daggett, California
 K18IP-D in Overton, Nevada
 K18IQ-D in Jacks Cabin, Colorado
 K18IR-D in Olivia, Minnesota
 K18IT-D in Green River, Utah
 K18IU-D in Mayfield, Utah
 K18IV-D in Mount Pleasant, Utah
 K18IZ-D in Grandfield, Oklahoma
 K18JA-D in Pinedale, Wyoming
 K18JD-D in Torrington, Wyoming
 K18JE-D in Broadus, Montana
 K18JG-D in Beowowe, Nevada
 K18JJ-D in Crowheart, Wyoming
 K18JM-D in Northome, Minnesota
 K18JU-D in Utahn, Utah
 K18JX-D in Hoehne, Colorado
 K18KA-D in Ely, Nevada
 K18KC-D in Wendover, Utah
 K18KD-D in Libby, Montana
 K18KG-D in Spencer, Iowa
 K18KH-D in Julesburg, Colorado
 K18KI-D in Baker City, Oregon
 K18KK-D in Columbia, Missouri
 K18KM-D in Conrad, Montana
 K18KO-D in Rural Summit County, Utah
 K18KT-D in Chinook, Montana
 K18LG-D in Shiprock, New Mexico
 K18LH-D in Lewiston, Idaho
 K18LJ-D in Dunsmuir, etc., California
 K18LL-D in Eads, etc., Colorado
 K18LM-D in Mud Canyon, New Mexico
 K18LS-D in Strong City, Oklahoma
 K18LT-D in Eagle Nest, New Mexico
 K18LU-D in Glendale, etc., Oregon
 K18LY-D in Seiling, Oklahoma
 K18LZ-D in Kingman, Arizona
 K18MB-D in International Falls, Minnesota
 K18MC-D in Enterprise, Utah
 K18MD-D in Childress, Texas
 K18ME-D in Richfield, etc., Utah
 K18MF-D in Torrey, etc., Utah
 K18MG-D in Panguitch, Utah
 K18MH-D in Rural Garfield, Utah
 K18ML-D in Henrieville, Utah
 K18MM-D in Rural Sevier County, Utah
 K18MN-D in Koosharem, Utah
 K18MO-D in Worthington, Minnesota
 K18MP-D in Ridgecrest, California
 K18MS-D in Akron, Colorado
 K18MT-D in Cedar City, Utah
 K18MV-D in Scipio/Holden, Utah
 K18MW-D in Leamington, Utah
 K18MX-D in Orangeville, etc., Utah
 K18MY-D in East Carbon County, Utah
 K18MZ-D in Forsyth, Montana
 K18NA-D in Pahrump, Nevada
 K18NB-D in Wray, Colorado
 K18NC-D in Malad, Idaho
 K18ND-D in Chico and Paradise, California
 K18NE-D in St. James, Minnesota
 K18NG-D in McDermitt, Nevada
 K18NH-D in Puyallup, Washington
 K18NI-D in Point Pulley, etc., Washington
 K18NJ-D in Bellingham, Washington
 K18NN-D in Globe, Arizona
 K18NO-D in Lubbock, Texas
 K18NQ-D in Rhinelander, Wisconsin
 K18NT-D in Grand Forks, North Dakota
 K18NW-D in Minot, North Dakota
 K27KD-D in Hatch, Utah
 K32HN-D in Circleville, etc., Utah
 K34JN-D in Montezuma Creek-Aneth, Utah
 K34JO-D in Bluff & area, Utah
 K35JL-D in Nephi, Utah
 K42HK-D in Cottage Grove, Oregon
 KAJJ-CD in Kalispell, Montana
 KCEI-LD in Taos, New Mexico
 KCLP-CA in Boise, Idaho
 KCWH-LD in Lincoln, Nebraska
 KDKZ-LD in Farmington, Missouri
 KDOV-LD in Medford, Oregon
 KFAZ-CA in Visalia, California
 KFTU-CD in Tucson, Arizona
 KHME in Rapid City, South Dakota
 KHMP-LD in Las Vegas, Nevada
 KIRO-TV (DRT) in Issaquah, Washington
 KIRO-TV (DRT) in Olympia, Washington
 KJTN-LP in Abilene, Texas
 KPSP-CD in Cathedral City, California
 KQKT-LD in Tyler, Texas
 KRNS-CD in Reno, Nevada
 KRTN-LD in Albuquerque, New Mexico
 KSWE-LD in Liberal, Kansas
 KTEW-LD in Ponca City, Oklahoma
 KTVV-LD in Hot Springs, Arkansas
 KUTB-LD in Salt Lake City, Utah
 KXCY-LD in Cheyenne, Wyoming
 KZCS-LD in Colorado Springs, Colorado
 W18BB-D in Elizabeth City, North Carolina
 W18CJ in Quincy, Illinois
 W18DQ-D in Santa Isabel, Puerto Rico
 W18DS-D in Chattanooga, Tennessee
 W18DZ-D in Ceiba, Puerto Rico
 W18EG-D in Onancock, Virginia
 W18EN-D in Sion Farm, St Croix, U.S. Virgin Islands
 W18EP-D in Weaverville, North Carolina
 W18ER-D in Muskegon, Michigan
 W18ES-D in Mansfield, Ohio
 W18ET-D in Birmingham, Alabama
 W18EU-D in Miami, Florida
 W18EV-D in New Bern, North Carolina
 W18EW-D in Jackson, Tennessee
 W18EZ-D in Delphi, Indiana
 W18FB-D in Sutton, West Virginia
 W18FC-D in Florence, South Carolina
 WBDL-LD in Elk Mound, Wisconsin
 WBGR-LD in Bangor/Dedham, Maine
 WBXC-CD in Champaign/Urbana, Illinois
 WCBZ-CD in Columbus, Ohio
 WDTB-LD in Hamburg, New York
 WDTJ-LD in Toledo, Ohio
 WESH (DRT) in Orange City, Florida
 WIEF-LD in Augusta, Georgia
 WLCN-CD in Charleston, South Carolina
 WLHA-LD in Laurel, Mississippi
 WMEU-CD in Chicago, Illinois
 WMPX-LD in Dennis, Massachusetts
 WMYO-CD in Louisville, Kentucky
 WNYT in Troy, New York
 WOIO (DRT) in Akron, Ohio
 WPGA-LD in Macon, Georgia
 WQDH-LD in Wilmington, North Carolina
 WQFT-LD in Ocala, Florida
 WQWQ-LD in Paducah, Kentucky
 WTXI-LD in Miami, Florida, which uses W18EU-D's spectrum
 WUET-LD in Savannah, Georgia
 WUHO-LD in Kalamazoo, Michigan
 WURO-LD in Roscommon, Michigan
 WUVF-LD in Naples, Florida
 WVVH-CD in Southampton, New York
 WWNY-CD in Massena, New York
 WXTM-LD in Erie, Pennsylvania
 WZDS-LD in Evansville, Indiana

The following low-power stations, which are no longer licensed, formerly broadcast on analog or digital channel 18:
 K18BW in Yerington, Nevada
 K18DH in Broken Bow, Nebraska
 K18DY in Hillsboro, New Mexico
 K18FZ in Orangeville, Utah
 K18GQ in Ruidoso, etc., New Mexico
 K18GW in Beowawe, Nevada
 K18HL in Amarillo, Texas
 K18IW-D in Rapid City, South Dakota
 K18LE-D in Newberry Springs, California
 K18MU-D in Round Mountain, Nevada
 KJVG-LD in Joplin, Missouri
 KSCM-LP in Bryan, Texas
 KTWN-LD in Searcy, Arkansas
 KXVZ-LP in Plainview, Texas
 KYEX-LP in Anchorage, Alaska
 W18AE in Killington, Vermont
 W18BN in Scranton, Pennsylvania
 W18BS in Hampton, Virginia
 W18DB in Port Richey, etc., Florida
 WAPG-CD in Greeneville, Tennessee
 WHNW-LD in Gary, Indiana
 WJPW-CD in Weirton, West Virginia
 WVBN-LP in Virginia Beach, Virginia

References

18 low-power